Antonio Edwards (born March 10, 1970) is a former American football defensive end in the National Football League (NFL) for the Seattle Seahawks, the New York Giants, the Atlanta Falcons, and the Carolina Panthers.  He played college football at Valdosta State University and was drafted in eighth round of the 1993 NFL Draft.  In 2000, Edwards was the twelfth pick of the XFL draft as a member of the Las Vegas Outlaws.  Edwards is currently the defensive line coach of the Collegiate School in Richmond, Virginia.

High school years
Edwards attended Colquitt County High School in Moultrie, Georgia, and was a student and a letterman in football.

Personal life
Edwards was a criminal justice major at Valdosta State. While a member of the Seahawks, Antonio sponsored a reading enrichment program and helped build a playground at Brighton Elementary School in Seattle. He has a wife named Michelle four sons Michael, Marcus, Marcell, Amahn and a daughter named Ashanti.

References

External links
Just Sports Stats

1970 births
American football defensive ends
Atlanta Falcons players
Carolina Panthers players
Living people
New York Giants players
Seattle Seahawks players
Valdosta State Blazers football players
Las Vegas Outlaws (XFL) players
Players of American football from Georgia (U.S. state)
People from Moultrie, Georgia